Lake Assal can refer to:

 Lake Assal (Djibouti), a crater lake in central Djibouti
 Lake Karum, a lake in the Afar Region of Ethiopia also known as Lake Assal